Days of Hunger is the debut studio album by Israeli alternative folk artist Geva Alon, released on 22 March 2006.

It is Alon's first album as a solo artist, and features a much more acoustic sound, with influences ranging from folk and indie rock to blues, country and psychedelic rock, with a big touch of Americana.

Track listing

Personnel
Geva Alon - lead vocals, guitar
Sagi Eiland - guitar, backing vocals
Elran Dekel - bass, backing vocals
Yaara Eilon - keyboards, backing vocals
Gil Reichental - drums, percussion
Matan Ashkenazy - accordion, percussion, backing vocals
Mika Sade - backing vocals

2006 debut albums
Geva Alon albums